Eva Silverstein (born October 24, 1970) is an American theoretical physicist, cosmologist, and string theorist. She is a professor of physics at Stanford University and director of the Modern Inflationary Cosmology collaboration within the Simons Foundation Origins of the Universe initiative.

Life, education, and work
Raised in Spokane, Washington, Silverstein is the daughter of Harry S. and Lorinda Knight Silverstein and graduated from Lewis and Clark High School. Her father is a professor emeritus of philosophy at Washington State University in Pullman. Silverstein earned her bachelor's degree in physics from Harvard University in 1992 and her doctoral degree from Princeton University four years later.

Silverstein's primary research areas include cosmic inflation, namely the creation of predictive and testable new mechanisms which have enabled systematic understanding of the process and the role of ultraviolet-sensitive qualities in observational cosmology (including string-theoretic versions of large field inflation and novel mechanisms involving inflation interactions); implications of long-range interactions in string theory for black hole physics; and mechanism development for breaking super-symmetry and stabilizing the extra dimensions of string theory. In her work on early-universe cosmology, she makes extensive contributions to string theory and gravitational physics.  Her early work included control of tachyon condensation in string theory and resulting resolution of some spacetime singularities (with Joseph Polchinski and others). Other significant research contributions include the construction of the first models of dark energy in string theory, some basic extensions of the AdS/CFT correspondence to more realistic field theories (with Shamit Kachru), as well as the discovery of a predictive new mechanism for cosmic inflation involving D-brane dynamics (with David Tong) which helped motivate more systematic analyses of primordial non-Gaussianity.

Silverstein is married to fellow string theorist Shamit Kachru; both were doctoral students of Edward Witten.

Academic appointments
Postdoctoral associate, Rutgers University, 1996–1997
Assistant professor, SLAC, Stanford, 1997–2001
Associate professor, SLAC and Stanford Physics Department, Stanford, 2001–2006
Professor, SLAC and Stanford Physics Department, Stanford, 2006–2016
Professor, Stanford Physics Department, Stanford, 2006–Present
Professor, University of California Physics Department

Awards and honors
MacArthur Fellow, 1999
DOE Outstanding Junior Investigator, 1999–2001
Sloan Fellowship, 1999–2003
Bergmann Memorial Award, 2000 
APS Fellow, 2016 "For fundamental contributions to quantum gravity and early universe cosmology."
 Simons Investigator, 2017
 American Academy of Arts and Sciences (AAAS) Elected Fellow, 2020

References

External links
Stanford University: Eva Silverstein
List of her papers

1970 births
Living people
MacArthur Fellows
Harvard University alumni
Princeton University alumni
Stanford University Department of Physics faculty
21st-century American physicists
American women physicists
Simons Investigator
Fellows of the American Academy of Arts and Sciences
21st-century American women scientists
Fellows of the American Physical Society